A. G. Subburaman (1930-1986) was an Indian politician and former Member of Parliament elected from Tamil Nadu. He was elected to the Lok Sabha from Madurai constituency as an Indian National Congress (Indira) candidate in 1980 election, and as an Indian National Congress candidate 1984 election.

References 

Indian National Congress politicians from Tamil Nadu
1930 births
1986 deaths
India MPs 1980–1984
India MPs 1984–1989
Lok Sabha members from Tamil Nadu
Politicians from Madurai
Tamil Nadu politicians